Rogers Arena is a multi-purpose arena located at 800 Griffiths Way in the downtown area of Vancouver, British Columbia, Canada. Opened in 1995, the arena was known as General Motors Place (GM Place) from its opening until July 6, 2010, when General Motors Canada ended its naming rights sponsorship and a new agreement for those rights was reached with Rogers Communications. Rogers Arena was built to replace Pacific Coliseum as Vancouver's primary indoor sports facility and in part due to the National Basketball Association (NBA) 1995 expansion into Canada, when Vancouver and Toronto were given expansion teams.

It is home to the Vancouver Canucks of the National Hockey League, the Vancouver Warriors of the National Lacrosse League and the Vancouver Titans of the Overwatch League. The arena also hosted the ice hockey events at the 2010 Winter Olympics. The name of the arena temporarily became Canada Hockey Place during the Olympics. It was previously home to the Vancouver Grizzlies of the NBA from 1995 to 2001. The Grizzlies spent six seasons in Vancouver before relocating to Memphis, for the 2001–02 season.

History

GM Place
The arena was completed in 1995 at a cost of C$160 million in private financing to replace the aging Pacific Coliseum as the main venue for events in Vancouver and to serve as the home arena to the Vancouver Canucks of the National Hockey League and the Vancouver Grizzlies of the National Basketball Association. It was originally named General Motors Place as part of a sponsorship arrangement with General Motors Canada, and was commonly known as "GM Place" or "The Garage". The arena was also briefly home to the Vancouver Ravens of the National Lacrosse League from 2002 to 2004. The operations of the team have since been suspended although attempts were made to revive the team in 2007 and again in 2008.

The employees of the arena belong to a trade union. In 2007, they chose to change their union affiliation from UNITE HERE – Local 40 to the Christian Labour Association of Canada. After many months of struggle, the British Columbia Labour Relations Board declared the employees choice of a new union. The employee group includes hosts, housekeeping, security and various event staff at the venue. UNITE-HERE local 40 still represented food service workers in the arena, employed by Aramark. Another union protest began in 2009 when GM Place concession workers, cooks and event staff protested their payment.

The arena's event technical employees are provided through Riggit Services Inc. In the same year, the arena also received a new suspended scoreboard, which at the time was the largest in the NHL.  It was temporarily renamed "Canada Hockey Place" for a two-week period during the 2010 Winter Olympics due to Olympics regulations regarding corporate sponsorship of event sites.

Rogers Arena
On July 6, 2010, it was announced that GM had declined to renew the naming rights, and that Rogers Communications had acquired the naming rights under a 10-year deal, under which it was renamed Rogers Arena. The following year, the arena reached a five-year sponsorship deal with PepsiCo, under which it became the exclusive provider of beverages and snacks at Rogers Arena, and gained sponsorship placements. In addition, all concerts held at Rogers Arena promote the venue as Pepsi Live at Rogers Arena.

In October 2010, prior to the 2010–11 Vancouver Canucks season. Canucks Sports & Entertainment installed four-storey high theatrical scrims, along with 16 projectors were installed. First setup of its kind in North American sports. Last time they were used was during the 2015–16 Vancouver Canucks season. They are still present inside the Arena however it is unknown when they will be ever used again.

In July 2012, Aquilini Investment Group had originally planned to build the towers with condo units. The switch to rental units provides the city with much-needed rental space. However, the city lost about $35 million in developer contributions to community facilities in the Northeast False Creek area that would have been collected if the buildings had been condos. As of June 2016, the first tower is completed, with the second tower nearing completion.

Notable events

Hockey
October 9, 1995 - First Vancouver Canucks game at the arena, 3–5 loss to the Detroit Red Wings.
October 6, 2002 – Queen Elizabeth II dropped the ceremonial first puck in an NHL exhibition game between the San Jose Sharks and the Vancouver Canucks.
 The 2010 Winter Olympics (ice hockey games only)
 June 1, 4, 10, and 15, 2011  – Games 1, 2, 5, and 7 of the 2011 Stanley Cup Finals. The Boston Bruins defeated the Canucks 4–0 in game 7 of the finals to capture the Stanley Cup.
December 26, 2018 – January 5, 2019 - 2019 World Junior Ice Hockey Championships.

UFC
June 12, 2010 – Hosted UFC 115.
June 11, 2011 – Hosted UFC 131.
June 14, 2014 – Hosted UFC 174.
August 27, 2016 – Host of UFC on Fox: Maia vs. Condit
September 14, 2019 – Host of UFC Fight Night: Cowboy vs. Gaethje

WWE
July 21, 1996 – Hosted WWE's In Your House 9: International Incident pay-per-view
December 13, 1998 – Hosted WWE's Rock Bottom: In Your House pay-per-view
February 14, 2020 – Hosted a live showing of WWE SmackDown

Concerts

July 1, 2011 – Britney Spears brought her Femme Fatale Tour to the venue.
September 10 & 11, 2011 - Taylor Swift brought her Speak Now World Tour to the venue. 
April 20 & 21, 2012 – Coldplay brought their Mylo Xyloto Tour to the venue. 
August 24, 25 and 27, 2012 – Metallica filmed their concert film Through the Never during their Full Arsenal Tour.
August 14, 2013 – Selena Gomez started her Stars Dance Tour at the venue.
February 9, 2014 – Demi Lovato started The Neon Lights Tour at the venue.
February 14, 2014 – Miley Cyrus started her Bangerz Tour at the venue.
April 16, 2015 – Ariana Grande brought The Honeymoon Tour to the venue.
April 10, 2016 – Iron Maiden performed at the arena during their Book of Souls World Tour.
April 19 and 20, 2016 – Sir Paul McCartney played two sold-out shows at the venue as part of the One on One Tour.
April 23, 2016 – Rihanna performed at the arena during her Anti World Tour.
July 20 and 21, 2016 – Adele performed at the arena during her Adele Live 2016 Tour.
October 17, 2016 Kanye West performed for his Saint Pablo Tour
August 1, 2017 Lady Gaga began her historic Joanne World Tour at the stadium.
December 7, 2018 – A venue included in Childish Gambino's final headlining tour.
January 29, 2019 – Travis Scott started his 2nd leg of his Astroworld – Wish You Were Here Tour.
April 1, 2022 – Dua Lipa performed a sold out show as part of her Future Nostalgia Tour.
June 20, 2022 – Diljit Dosanjh sold out the arena during his Born to Shine World Tour.
July 2, 2022 – Shawn Mendes performed a sold out show as part of his Wonder: The World Tour.
August 28, 2022 – Kendrick Lamar performed for his Big Steppers Tour.

Juno Awards
March 22, 1998 – Hosted the 27th annual Juno Awards
March 29, 2009 – Hosted the 38th annual Juno Awards
March 25, 2018 – Hosted the 47th annual Juno Awards

Other events
March 17–25, 2001 – Hosted the 2001 World Figure Skating Championships
August 20–25, 2018 – Host of The International 2018 Dota 2 eSports tournament

See also
List of National Hockey League arenas
List of National Basketball Association arenas
List of indoor arenas in Canada
Rogers Centre in Toronto, Ontario
Rogers Place in Edmonton, Alberta
National Hockey League
Vancouver Canucks
Pacific Coliseum

References

External links

 Rogers Arena Home Page
 General Motors Place at Hockeyarenas.net

1995 establishments in British Columbia
Venues of the 2010 Winter Olympics
Basketball venues in Canada
Former National Basketball Association venues
Sports venues completed in 1995
Indoor ice hockey venues in British Columbia
Indoor lacrosse venues in Canada
Music venues in Vancouver
National Hockey League venues
Olympic ice hockey venues
Rogers Communications
Sports venues in Vancouver
Vancouver VooDoo
Vancouver Warriors
Vancouver Titans
Esports venues in Canada
Vancouver Canucks
Vancouver Grizzlies